The Shreveport Gassers were a Texas League baseball team based in Shreveport, Louisiana, United States that played from 1915 to 1924. They were affiliated with the Philadelphia Athletics from 1923 to 1924.

Under manager Billy Smith, they won their only league championship in 1919.

References

 
Defunct Texas League teams
Baseball teams established in 1915
Defunct minor league baseball teams
Gas
Professional baseball teams in Louisiana
Philadelphia Athletics minor league affiliates
1915 establishments in Louisiana
1924 disestablishments in Louisiana
Baseball teams disestablished in 1924
Defunct baseball teams in Louisiana